Benzathine is a diamine used as a component in some medications including benzathine phenoxymethylpenicillin and benzathine benzylpenicillin.  It stabilises penicillin and prolongs its sojourn when injected into tissues.

Diamines